George Libman Engel (December 10, 1913 – November 26, 1999) was an American internist and psychiatrist. He spent most of his career at the University of Rochester Medical Center in Rochester, New York. He is best known for his formulation of the biopsychosocial model, a general theory of illness and healing.

History

Early life
Engel was born in New York City in 1913. He completed his undergraduate degree in chemistry from Dartmouth College in 1934. In the same year, he entered Johns Hopkins University School of Medicine in Baltimore, Maryland to study medicine. He received his medical degree in 1938.

Academic career
After completing his medical degree, Engel began an internship at Mount Sinai Hospital in New York City; their physicians such as Eli Moschowitz and Lawrence Kubie were incorporating psychosomatics into the clinical service. At the time, Engel was skeptical of psychoanalysis and psychosomatic medicine. He was committed to purely physical explanations of disease processes.

Engel began a Research Fellowship in Medicine at Harvard Medical School and also Graduate Assistant in Medicine at the Peter Bent Brigham Hospital (now Brigham and Women's Hospital) in 1941. He came under the supervision of physician Soma Weiss, who at this time was becoming interested in psychosomatics. At this time, he first met with psychiatrist John Romano. Romano had arrived in Boston several years before Engel. With the encouragement from Weiss, Engel and Romano collaborated on a study of delusional patients. In 1942, Romano became chairman of the psychiatry department at the University of Cincinnati. Romano invited Engel to join the faculty at Cincinnati and Engel accepted the invitation.  At this point Engel converted to the psychosomatic school.

University of Rochester
Romano was given the opportunity to establish an entirely new psychiatry department at the School of Medicine and Dentistry of the University of Rochester Medical Center in 1946. Engel joined Romano in Rochester. He had dual appointments in psychiatry and medicine departments. He was responsible for establishing a medical psychiatric liaison service staffed largely by internists. He became deeply involved in the incorporation of psychiatric training in the medical school curriculum, and also began his own training in psychoanalysis.

Engel began a collaboration with Franz Reichsman on the Monica project, a study that extended from Monica's infancy to adulthood, in 1953. By the mid-1950s, he was considered one of the major figures in psychosomatic studies. He was prominent in the American Psychosomatic Society. He also edited its journal, Psychosomatic Medicine and began publishing numerous books and articles on the relation of emotion and disease and on the incorporation of these ideas into medical training and clinical practice. Under his direction, the program at the university became a leading center in the development of psychosomatic theory and training. His ideas came to be termed as the biopsychosocial model.

The fundamental assumption of the biopsychosocial model is that health and illness are consequences of the interplay of biological, psychological, and social factors. This concept is particularly important in health psychology. This model was theorised by Engel at Rochester and putatively discussed in a 1977 article in the journal Science.

Late years

In his later years, Engel never lost his sense of humor and his generosity. He was admired by his students and physicians who worked with him.  He died suddenly of heart failure in 1999.

Awards and honors
Engel received many awards and honors from the American College of Physicians and the American Psychiatric Association for his work.

Publications
 Engel, George L., and R.W. Gerard.  “The Phosphorus Metabolism of Invertebrate Nerve,” The Journal of Biological Chemistry 112 (1935): 379-392.
 Gurvich, Aleksandr Gavrilovich, and George L. Engel.  Mitogenetic Analysis of the Excitation of the Nervous System.  Amsterdam: N.v. Noord-Hollandsche Uitgeversmaatschappij, 1937.
 Romano, J., and George L. Engel.  “Syncopal Reactions during Simulated Exposure to High Altitude in Decompression Chamber,” War Medicine (1943): 475-489.
 Engel, George L., and J. Romano.  Scotomata, Blurring of Vision, and Headache as Complications of Decompression Sickness.  Washington, 1943.
 Engel, George L., and J. Romano.  “A Migraine-like Syndrome Complicating Decompression Sickness: Clinical and Electroencephalographic Observations,” Transactions of the American Neurological Association (1944): 60-64.
 Engel, George L., and J. Romano.  A Migraine-like Syndrome Complicating Decompression Sickness: Scintillating Scotomas, Focal Neurologic Signs and Headache: Clinical and Electroencephalographic Observations.  War Medicine (1944): 304-314.
 Romano, J., and George L. Engel.  Problems of Fatigue as Illustrated by Experiences in the Decompression Chamber,” War Medicine (1944): 102-105.
 Engel, George L.  Fainting: Physiological and Psychological Considerations.  Springfield, Ill.: C.C. Thomas, 1950.
 Engel, George L.  Fainting.  Springfield, Ill.: Thomas, 1962.
 Engel, George L.  Psychological Development in Health and Disease.  Philadelphia, Saunders, 1962.
 Morgan, William L., and George L. Engel.  The Clinical Approach to the Patient.  Philadelphia, Saunders, 1969.
 Engel, George L. and William L. Morgan.  Interviewing the Patient.  London, Philadelphia, Saunders, 1973.
 Engel, George L. "The need for a new medical model: a challenge for biomedicine". Science.1977.196(3):129-136.

References

1913 births
1999 deaths
American psychiatrists
Dartmouth College alumni
Harvard Medical School people
Johns Hopkins School of Medicine alumni
University of Cincinnati faculty
University of Rochester faculty
Physicians from New York City
20th-century American physicians
Members of the National Academy of Medicine